Pikeland Township may refer to:

 East Pikeland Township, Chester County, Pennsylvania
 West Pikeland Township, Chester County, Pennsylvania